Arthroplea congener is a species of mayflies belonging to the family Heptageniidae.

It is native to Europe.

References

Mayflies
Insects described in 1908